The 2017–18 season will be Diósgyőri VTK's 52nd competitive season, 7th consecutive season in the OTP Bank Liga and 107th year in existence as a football club.

Players

Current squad

Out on loan

Transfers

Summer

In:

Out:

Winter

In:

Out:

Statistics

Appearances and goals
Last updated on 2 June 2018.

|-
|colspan="14"|Youth players:

|-
|colspan="14"|Players no longer at the club:

|}

Top scorers
Includes all competitive matches. The list is sorted by shirt number when total goals are equal.

Last updated on 2 June 2018

Disciplinary record
Includes all competitive matches. Players with 1 card or more included only.

Last updated on 2 June 2018

Overall
{|class="wikitable"
|-
|Games played || 40 (33 OTP Bank Liga and 7 Hungarian Cup)
|-
|Games won || 16 (10 OTP Bank Liga and 6 Hungarian Cup)
|-
|Games drawn || 6 (6 OTP Bank Liga and 0 Hungarian Cup)
|-
|Games lost || 18 (17 OTP Bank Liga and 1 Hungarian Cup)
|-
|Goals scored || 55
|-
|Goals conceded || 57
|-
|Goal difference || −2
|-
|Yellow cards || 93
|-
|Red cards || 5
|-
|rowspan="1"|Worst discipline ||  Zoltán Lipták (7 , 2 )
|-
|rowspan="1"|Best result || 5–0 (A) v Vasas – OTP Bank Liga – 14-10-2017
|-
|rowspan="2"|Worst result || 0–4 (A) v Balmazújváros – OTP Bank Liga – 05-08-2017
|-
| 0–4 (A) v Ferencváros – OTP Bank Liga – 27-05-2018
|-
|rowspan="1"|Most appearances ||  Roland Ugrai (36 appearances)
|-
|rowspan="1"|Top scorer ||  Roland Ugrai (12 goals)
|-
|Points || 51/120 (42.5%)
|-

Nemzeti Bajnokság I

Matches

League table

Results summary

Results by round

Hungarian Cup

References

External links
 Official Website
 UEFA
 fixtures and results

Diósgyőri VTK seasons
Hungarian football clubs 2017–18 season